Rhamnus prinoides, the shiny-leaf buckthorn, is an African shrub or small tree in the family Rhamnaceae. Commonly referred to as "gesho" it was first scientifically described by French botanist Charles Louis L'Héritier de Brutelle in 1789.

Description
Rhamnus prinoides occur from  Ethiopia, Eritrea to South Africa at medium to high altitudes. They grow near streams or along forest margins. The small edible fruits are shiny red and berry-like.

Uses
The Rhamnus prinoides plant has many uses amongst the inhabitants of Africa. All parts of the plant are harvested and used for nutrition, medicine or religious purposes. Gesho, as it is known in Ethiopia and Eritrea, 

In Ethiopia and Eritrea, where the plant is known as gesho or gešo, it is used in a manner similar to hops. The stems are boiled and the extract mixed with honey to ferment a mead called tej in Amharic and myes in Tigrinya.

It is also used in the brewing of tella (siwa in Tigrinya), an Ethiopian and Eritrean beer. This local drink is made from gesho as a major ingredient. Gesho leaves are sundried and pounded with mortar and pestle into flour. Barley malt is prepared and sundried and ground. These two ingredients are mixed, in a proportion that varies from maker to maker, and fermented 3 to 5 days on average. Finger millet (or sorghum and maize flour regionally) are baked, and finally mixed with the fermented solution. After 1–2 days of fermentation, the tella can be filtered and consumed in a drink locally called  ( in Tigrinya).

Gallery

References

 Trees of Southern Africa, K C Palgrave, 1984  

prinoides
Flora of Africa
Flora of Southern Africa
Plants described in 1789
Trees of Ethiopia
Trees of South Africa
Ethiopian cuisine